Frans De Mulder (17 December 1937 in Kruishoutem – 5 March 2001 in Deinze) was a professional road racing cyclist from Belgium between 1958 and 1963.

De Mulder is most famous for winning the overall title and four stages the 1960 Vuelta a España. He bested fellow countryman Armand Desmet and Spaniard Miguel Pacheco across 3566 km in 17 stages.

Major results 

1959
 1st Stage 5a Tour de l'Ouest
 3rd Liège–Bastogne–Liège
 4th Milan–San Remo
 4th Brussels–Ingooigem
 7th Paris–Roubaix
 7th La Flèche Wallonne
1960
 1st  Road race, National Road Championships
 1st  Overall Vuelta a España
1st Stages 4, 7, 16 & 17a
 2nd Gent–Wevelgem
 3rd Omloop van het Houtland
 5th Harelbeke–Antwerp–Harelbeke
 6th Tour of Flanders
 6th Dwars door België
 7th Overall Tour de Luxembourg
1st Stage 4 
 7th Milan–San Remo
 7th Kuurne–Brussels–Kuurne
 10th Brussels–Ingooigem
1961 
 1st Kampioenschap van Vlaanderen
 8th Kuurne–Brussels–Kuurne
1962
 Critérium du Dauphiné Libéré
1st  Points classification
1st Stage 7 
 3rd Overall Tour de Luxembourg
 3rd Harelbeke–Antwerp–Harelbeke
 4th Road race, National Road Championships
 5th Omloop Het Volk
 7th Overall Four Days of Dunkirk
 9th Kuurne–Brussels–Kuurne
 9th De Kustpijl
1963
 1st Nokere Koerse
 3rd Overall Tour of Belgium
1st Stage 3b (ITT)
 5th De Kustpijl
 8th GP Stad Zottegem

Grand Tour general classification results timeline

External links 

1937 births
2001 deaths
Belgian male cyclists
Vuelta a España winners
Belgian Vuelta a España stage winners
Cyclists from East Flanders
People from Kruisem